Igor Kulish (born 27 June 1964) is a Russian football goalkeeping coach and former goalkeeper.

References

1964 births
Living people
Soviet footballers
Russian footballers
Footballers from Luhansk
FC Chernomorets Novorossiysk players
FC Kuban Krasnodar players
FC Zorya Luhansk players
FC Chernomorets Burgas players
PFC Nesebar players
Botev Plovdiv players
PFC Lokomotiv Plovdiv players
FC Septemvri Sofia players
PFC Spartak Varna players
First Professional Football League (Bulgaria) players
Association football goalkeepers
Expatriate footballers in Bulgaria